Larry L. Meyer is an American journalist, author and academic. He is the former editor-in-chief of Westways, the magazine of the Automobile Club of Southern California, and a professor emeritus of journalism at California State University, Long Beach. He is a 1959 cum laude graduate of the University of California, Los Angeles (UCLA), where he was president of his graduate class, and earned a master's degree in journalism at UCLA in 1960.

Meyer is a longtime resident of Huntington Beach, California. In the early 1980s, divorced from a 21-year marriage, Meyer married one of his journalism students. After two children with her and in his late 50s, he retired from teaching to become a stay-at-home father to an unexpected sixth child and to support his wife's career. These experiences became the basis for two of his books, My Summer With Molly and No Paltry Thing, both self-published through a small publishing company he founded, Calafia Press.

Bibliography
Meyer's books include:

References

Year of birth missing (living people)
Living people
Journalists from California
American magazine editors
American journalism academics
University of California, Los Angeles alumni
California State University, Long Beach faculty
20th-century American journalists
21st-century American journalists
American male journalists